Shannen Doherty (born April 12, 1971) is an American actress. She is known for her many roles of television and film, including as Jenny Wilder in Little House on the Prairie (1982–1983); Maggie Malene in Girls Just Want to Have Fun (1985); Kris Witherspoon in Our House (1986–1988); Heather Duke in Heathers (1989); Brenda Walsh in Beverly Hills, 90210 (1990–94), 90210 (2008–2009) and again in BH90210 (2019); Prue Halliwell in Charmed (1998–2001); and Dobbs in Fortress (2021).

Early life
Doherty was raised in her mother's Southern Baptist faith.

Career

Child acting: Until 1988
In 1982, Doherty had guest spots on TV series including Voyagers! and Father Murphy, which was created and produced by Michael Landon. The same year, 11-year-old Doherty won the recurring role of Jenny Wilder on Little House on the Prairie, which Landon starred in and produced. Doherty appeared in all but four episodes on the final season of the show, which was cancelled in 1983.

Doherty lent her voice to the animated film The Secret of NIMH in 1982. She appeared in an episode of Magnum, P.I. ("A Sense of Debt"), followed by an early episode of Airwolf for which she was nominated as Best Young Actress: Guest in a Series at the 6th Youth in Film Awards in 1984.

In 1985, she starred as Maggie Malene in the teen movie comedy Girls Just Want to Have Fun alongside actresses Helen Hunt and Sarah Jessica Parker. Doherty was cast as the oldest Witherspoon sibling, Kris, on the family drama Our House, which ran from 1986 to 1988, a role which garnered her several Young Artist Award nominations.

Fame: 1988–2001

Doherty's first major motion picture role was in the dark comedy Heathers, which premiered in 1988. She garnered worldwide attention and fame for her breakout role as Brenda Walsh in the Aaron Spelling-produced TV series Beverly Hills, 90210 in 1990. In 1991 and 1992, her portrayal of Brenda earned her a Young Artist Award nomination for Best Young Actress Starring in a Television Series. Doherty left the show after the fourth season in 1994.

She appeared nude in Playboy magazine, first in December 1993, followed by a spread in March 1994. She posed for the magazine again in December 2003 and has been featured in a 10-page pictorial.

Doherty's career afterward consisted primarily of made-for-TV movies, though she also had a lead role in Kevin Smith's 1995 film Mallrats and later cameoed in Jay and Silent Bob Strike Back. In 1998, Spelling again cast her in another of his television series, Charmed, in which she played one of the lead characters, Prue Halliwell, the oldest of three sisters who are witches. Doherty also directed a few episodes for the series during the second and third seasons. Doherty left the show in 2001 at the end of the third season, resulting in her character's death. Reportedly, the reason for her departure was because of on-set and off-set tensions between Doherty and co-star Alyssa Milano. Doherty was also twice nominated, in 1999 and 2000, for the Saturn Award, Best Genre TV Actress, for her performance in Charmed. In 2004, E! placed Doherty at number 10 on their list of the 50 Most Wicked Women of Prime Time. In 2007, AOL named Prue Halliwell the 10th greatest witch in television history.

Later work: 2002–present
In 2003, Doherty hosted the Sci Fi Channel candid-camera show Scare Tactics during its initial season. From 2004 to 2005, in a return to her prime-time soap roots, Doherty starred as a regular on the short-lived TV series North Shore, where she starred as Alexandra Hudson. Later in 2005, she was in the pilot for a comedy, Love Inc.

In 2006, Doherty produced and starred in her own reality show, Breaking Up with Shannen Doherty, which premiered on the Oxygen channel. In the show, Doherty carried out the "dirty work" for members of the public, including dumping boyfriends or telling people what their friends really think about them. The show was canceled after one season due to poor ratings.

She also appeared in several episodes of the popular British sitcom Bo! in the USA, a brain child of Leigh Francis. In the show, she played herself being randomly harassed by Avid Merrion (Francis), who claimed they were lovers. The show aired in October 2006 on the British Channel 4.

During 2007, Doherty appeared in two television projects. She first appeared in Kiss Me Deadly: A Jacob Keane Assignment for the Here TV network and followed up with a starring role in the holiday film Christmas Caper for ABC Family. That same year Doherty also set up a production company called No Apologies with which she planned to develop a TV drama for herself. Later in 2007, Doherty was ranked number 96 on Entertainment Weekly'''s list of the 100 Greatest Television Icons.

In 2008, Doherty was featured on the Swedish television show High Chaparall, appearing in the second episode of the show's fourth season.

Also in 2008, 14 years since her last television appearance as Brenda Walsh, Doherty joined the cast of the Beverly Hills, 90210 spin off for The CW Television Network for a reported $40,000–50,000 an episode. She returned as a guest star in the new series, reprising her old role of Brenda in four of the initial six episodes. Her character, now a successful theater actress and stage director, returned as the guest director of the high school musical. After her initial guest spot was completed, Doherty stated she was open to returning to the series later in the season and eventually agreed to appear in three additional episodes, including an airing in May 2009. The writers were eager to have her share scenes with Jennie Garth, who reprised her own 90210 role of Kelly Taylor. It was reported that Doherty and Garth's characters would both have a romantic interest in the character Ryan Matthews (Ryan Eggold) reminiscent of their old rivalry for former bad-boy character Dylan McKay (Luke Perry). Doherty and Garth later confirmed that the reports about the love triangle between their characters were false.

In late 2008, Doherty was announced to co-star alongside Dylan McDermott in the independent film Burning Palms, a satire based on Los Angeles stereotypes told through five intertwining storylines. (The film's world premiere was at the Newport Beach Film Festival in April 2010.) Doherty played a lead role in the SciFi Channel adventure film The Lost Treasure of the Grand Canyon. The film premiered on the cable network on December 20, 2008.

On March 1, 2010, it was announced that Doherty would be a celebrity contestant on Dancing with the Stars for the tenth season. The season premiered on Monday, March 22, 2010. Doherty was paired with two-time champion Mark Ballas in his sixth season on the show, but the pair was the first couple eliminated in the second week on March 30. The judges said, "Doherty wouldn't have left if we would have just done scores". She wanted to do Dancing with the Stars to make her ailing father proud. Doherty returned for the finale.

Doherty starred in FEARnet's animated web series Mari-Kari, which launched on June 3, 2010. Mari and Kari are identical twins, but Kari is already dead and is a ghost. Doherty voiced both Mari and Kari in the eight-episode show.

On July 21, 2011, WE tv announced that Doherty would star in a one-hour reality series that would follow her and her fiancé, Kurt Iswarienko, as they planned their wedding. The show, Shannen Says, premiered on April 10, 2012.

Later in 2012, Doherty became a spokesperson for Education Connection, and appeared in an episode of The New Normal as her character Brenda Walsh from Beverly Hills, 90210.

On July 24, 2014, it was announced that Doherty and her former Charmed co-star Holly Marie Combs would star in their own road-trip reality show called Off the Map with Shannen & Holly, which premiered on Great American Country on January 2, 2015. The six-episode series followed the pair traveling across southeastern United States, with stops in Kentucky, Tennessee, Mississippi, Alabama, Georgia and Florida. Viewers were able to vote on activities in which Doherty and Combs engaged at each destination on Great American Country's official website.

In November 2016, Doherty joined the cast of a Heathers television series, originally set to air on Paramount Network in March 2018. She played the mother of one of the new generation of "Heathers", different from the character of Heather Duke that she originated in the 1989 film. However, the Parkland school shooting affected the show's premiere, which was delayed because of its dark tone and themes of high school violence. In June 2018, the network chose to pull the show altogether. Ultimately, the series aired over five nights in October 2018.

Doherty once more reprised her role of Brenda Walsh for the six-episode sequel BH90210, which debuted August 7, 2019, on FOX. The same year, she was in the movie Undateable John, starring Daryl Hannah, Tom Arnold and Margaret Cho.

In 2021, she was in the movie Fortress starring Jesse Metcalfe, Bruce Willis, Chad Michael Murray, Kelly Greyson, Ser'Darius Blain The film was released in select theaters and on video on demand by Lionsgate Films on December 17, 2021.

Personal life
In early 1993, Doherty was briefly engaged to Max Factor heir Dean Jay Factor before he filed for a restraining order on May 25, 1993. He alleged physical violence and threats on the part of Doherty, although Doherty's father claimed that the abuse came from Factor and not her.

On October 11, 1993, Doherty married Ashley Hamilton, the son of actor George Hamilton. They filed for divorce in April 1994.

In 1996, Doherty became the godmother to Cooper Smith London, the daughter of actor Jason London and actress Charlie Spradling.

In 2002, Doherty married Rick Salomon, but the marriage was annulled after nine months. On October 15, 2011, Doherty married photographer Kurt Iswarienko in Malibu, California.

In November 2018, Doherty lost her house to the Woolsey Fire.

"Bad girl" reputation
Beginning with her time working on Beverly Hills, 90210, Doherty gained a reputation in the media for bad behavior that dominated her public image for many years. The magazine People has called her the "iconic Hollywood 'bad girl' of the nineties". Between 1992 and 1994, coverage alleging fighting between Doherty and her co-stars dominated tabloid headlines, particularly concerning her heated feud with Jennie Garth, and further reports of heavy partying, on-set lateness, and physical fights. The zine Ben Is Dead, which published a newsletter called "I Hate Brenda" at the height of the show's popularity, even opened a hotline called the "Shannen Snitch Line" to which people could call in and report gossip about Doherty.

This reputation gained further ground during her three seasons on Charmed, when tabloids fueled rumors of a feud with co-star Alyssa Milano. In both instances, Doherty departed the shows acrimoniously after a few seasons; on Charmed she was allegedly fired by producer Aaron Spelling after an ultimatum from Milano.90210 executive producers Darren Star and Charles Rosin have both confirmed that Doherty was difficult to work with on-set; Rosin commented that "...she had habitual lateness. Her lateness was appalling, and she had a callous attitude and an indifference." Jennie Garth has admitted that the two of them "often wanted to claw each other's eyes out" several times. At one point when in 1993, an argument between Doherty and Garth on the Beverly Hills, 90210 set escalated into physical violence; nonetheless, Garth has said the feud was mutual and based more on immaturity than true animosity, and that the feud has been long over. Doherty, for her part, has admitted to making mistakes, blaming her behavior on the pressures of fame, her youth, and problems in her personal life. In 2010, she stated: "I have a rep. Did I earn it? Yeah, I did. But, after a while you sort of try to shed that rep because you're kind of a different person. You've evolved and all of the bad things you've done in your life have brought you to a much better place."

Her dysfunctional reputation inspired the Billy Bermingham-written satirical farce Shannen Doherty Shoots a Porno: A Shockumentary which featured Alexandra Billings and was performed at Chicago's Torso Theatre for three years from 1994 to 1997.Lefkowitz, David. "Shannen Doherty Traded In For Crack Baby At Torso," Playbill (magazine), Monday, March 17, 1997. Retrieved February 26, 2023.

Politics and activism
Doherty is a registered Republican. According to Complex'' magazine, she said: "I realize that the majority of people in the entertainment business happen to be Democrats. I have no problem with that. And they should have no problem with the fact that I'm a Republican."

An avid animal rights activist, Doherty is a supporter of the Sea Shepherd Conservation Society, and while performing the Ice Bucket Challenge in 2014 she challenged founder Paul Watson and global supporters of the Sea Shepherd Conservation Society.

Health
In 1999, Doherty revealed she had been diagnosed with Crohn's disease.

In March 2015, Doherty was diagnosed with breast cancer, which had spread to her lymph nodes. In February 2016, Doherty revealed that she was receiving anti-estrogen treatment to shrink the tumor and enable treatment by lumpectomy rather than mastectomy. Due to the presence of multiple tumors a lumpectomy was not possible, and a unilateral mastectomy was performed in May 2016. Surgery revealed that some of the cancer cells may have spread beyond the lymph nodes. Because the cancer was more advanced than previously thought, Doherty underwent chemotherapy and radiotherapy following surgery. On April 29, 2017, Doherty announced that her cancer was in remission.

On February 4, 2020, Doherty announced her cancer had returned a year prior, and that she is now stage four. 

In October 2021, Doherty provided an update on her cancer treatment during an interview with Juju Chang of ABC News.

Filmography

Awards and nominations

References

External links

 
 

1971 births
Living people
20th-century American actresses
21st-century American actresses
American child actresses
American film actresses
American soap opera actresses
American television actresses
American television directors
American television producers
American women television directors
American women television producers
Participants in American reality television series
People with Crohn's disease